Sir Austin Uvedale Morgan Hudson, 1st Baronet (6 February 1897 – 29 November 1956) was a Conservative Party politician in the United Kingdom.

Constituencies
Hudson was first elected at the 1922 general election as Member of Parliament (MP) for Islington East, but lost the seat at the 1923 election. He returned to Parliament at the 1924 general election when he won the Hackney North seat from the Liberal Party MP John Harris. He held that seat until the Labour landslide at the 1945 general election, when he lost by a large margin to Labour's Henry Goodrich. Hudson was returned to the House of Commons at the 1950 general election for the new Lewisham North.

Government offices
In Ramsay MacDonald's National Government 1931–1935 he was a Lord of the Treasury (i.e., a government whip), and in the second National Government he was Parliamentary Secretary to the Ministry of Transport from 1935 to 1939, and then Civil Lord of the Admiralty from 1939 to 1940. He was reappointed to the Admiralty in Winston Churchill's war-time coalition, but he left the government in March 1942. He returned to office briefly in 1945, as Parliamentary Secretary to the Minister of Fuel and Power in Churchill's 1945 caretaker government which held office from May to July that year.

Personal
Hudson was made a baronet in July 1942, of North Hackney, in the County of Middlesex.

His widow, Margaret, was an early employer of Archibald Hall, a known serial murderer and thief.

References

Further reading

External links
 
 

|-

1897 births
1956 deaths
Admiralty personnel of World War II
Baronets in the Baronetage of the United Kingdom
Conservative Party (UK) MPs for English constituencies
Hackney Members of Parliament
Lords of the Admiralty
Ministers in the Chamberlain peacetime government, 1937–1939
Ministers in the Chamberlain wartime government, 1939–1940
Ministers in the Churchill caretaker government, 1945
Ministers in the Churchill wartime government, 1940–1945
UK MPs 1922–1923
UK MPs 1924–1929
UK MPs 1929–1931
UK MPs 1931–1935
UK MPs 1935–1945
UK MPs 1950–1951
UK MPs 1951–1955
UK MPs 1955–1959